Moiwana is a Maroon village in the Marowijne district in the east of Suriname.

The army attacked the village, killing at least 35 of the inhabitants, mostly women and children, and burned Brunswijk's house. The survivors fled with thousands of other inland inhabitants over the Marowijne River to neighboring French Guiana.

The human rights organisation Moiwana '86 has committed itself to justice with regard to this event.

Police chief inspector Herman Gooding was murdered in August 1990 while investigating the massacre. Reportedly he was forced out of his car near Fort Zeelandia and shot in the head, with his body left outside Bouterse's office. Other police investigators fled the country, stalling the investigation.

The government has stated that it is still continuing its investigation of the massacre, but that prospective witnesses either had moved or died, or were uncooperative. It has also said that an investigation of the murder of Herman Gooding was continuing.

In August 2005, the Inter-American Court of Human Rights ordered Suriname to pay US$3 million in compensation to 130 survivors of the massacre, and to establish a US$1.2 million fund for the development of Moiwana.

Notable people 
 Ronnie Brunswijk (1961), Vice President of Suriname, ex-rebel leader and business man.

References

External links 
 UN Human Rights Committee press release; Eightieth Session 2173rd Meeting (PM)
 Amnesty International report on Suriname
 Suriname's govt to apologise for 1986 massacre, Radio Jamaica (14 July 2006, archived 2007)
  (book including information on Moiwana Massacre)

Inter-American Court of Human Rights cases
Ndyuka settlements
Populated places in Marowijne District